Acevedo is the fourth station of the Medellín Metro from north to south on line A and the first station on line K and P. It is located in the northernmost part of the municipality of Medellín, close to the natural boundary with Bello. The station was opened on 30 November 1995 as part of the inaugural section of line A, from Niquía to Poblado.

The transfer station is line K leading to the Santo Domingo Savio neighborhood (northeast of the city) by the Metro Cable.

References

External links
 Official site of Medellín Metro 

Medellín Metro stations
Railway stations opened in 1995
1995 establishments in Colombia